The Living Sea is a 70mm American documentary film exploring marine locales intended to show the importance of protecting the ocean, released to IMAX theaters in 1995. It is narrated by actress Meryl Streep, with music by Sting, produced by Science World, a Vancouver-based science education centre, and underwater imagery directed by filmmaker Greg MacGillivray.

Overview
The film is a survey of the world's oceans, emphasizing that it is a single interconnected ocean and the dependence of all life on the planet. The film shows researchers tracking whales, a Coast Guard rough-weather rescue squad, a deep-ocean research team, and the Palau Islands, which contain an unusual jellyfish habitat.

The film is directed by Academy Award-nominated IMAX director and cinematographer Greg MacGillivray, who also directed similar water-conservation themed documentaries such as Grand Canyon Adventure: River at Risk. The film was nominated for an Academy Award for Best Documentary Short but lost to One Survivor Remembers.

Soundtrack
 The Living Sea: Soundtrack from the IMAX Film

References

External links
 The Living Sea at MacGillivray Freeman Films
 
 

1995 films
American documentary films
Short films directed by Greg MacGillivray
IMAX short films
1995 documentary films
Documentary films about marine biology
Films shot in Palau
MacGillivray Freeman Films films
IMAX documentary films
1990s English-language films
1990s American films